The St. Louis Fire Department (STLFD or STL City Fire) provides emergency medical services, fire cause determination, fire prevention, fire suppression, hazardous materials mitigation, and rescue services to the city of St. Louis, Missouri. The department is also the second oldest professional and fully paid fire department in the United States.

The Fire Department Division is a division of the St. Louis Public Safety Department.

The St. Louis Fire Department is led by the Fire Commissioner, currently Dennis M. Jenkerson. The Fire Commissioner and Chief is appointed by the Director of Public Safety and each bureau is commanded by a Deputy Fire Chief, who oversees the department's bureaus. Administrative Services, Fire Prevention, Operations, Support Services, Emergency Medical Services are the major operational units in the St. Louis Fire Department.

History
The first organized fire department in St. Louis was created in 1822, had several volunteer fire departments in the area. An ordinance was passed to purchase the equipment, which primarily consisted of leather buckets. When the alarm sounded, members of the department would fetch their bucket and rush to the scene. On September 14, 1857, the department transitioned to an all-paid department. The St. Louis Fire Department is the third oldest fully paid fire department, behind the Cincinnati Fire Department and the Providence Fire Department.

Specialized units
In addition to fire suppression and emergency medical services, the St. Louis Fire Department also has specialized units that include:

Aircraft Rescue Firefighting at St. Louis Lambert International Airport
Hazmat Task Force
Marine Operations with a Boston Whaler called the "Jack Buck & Stan Musial," which is permanently moored on the Mississippi River, along with five other small rapidly deployable boats.
Dive and Swift Water Rescue
High-Angle Rope Rescue
Trench and Collapse Rescue

Fire Administration

The St. Louis Fire Department is headed by a Fire Commissioner. Currently, the Fire Commissioner and Chief is Dennis Jenkerson, who replaced former Fire Commissioner Sherman George in 2007.

The SLFD'S's organization consists of seven bureaus. These include the following:
Each bureau is commanded by a Deputy Chief or Deputy Fire Chief or Manager.

Bureau of Emergency Medical Services 
Bureau of Prevention 
Bureau of Communications 
Bureau of Support Services 
Bureau of Fire Inspections 
Bureau of Fire Investigations 
Bureau of Fire Suppression

Administration

Ranks of the STLFD 

In the St. Louis Fire Department, helmet colors often denote a fire fighter's rank or position. In general, white helmets denote chief officers, while red helmets may denote company officers. The specific meaning of a helmet's color or style varies from region to region and department to department. The rank of an officer in the St. Louis Fire Department is most commonly denoted by a number of speaking trumpets, a reference to a megaphone-like device used in the early days of the fire service, although typically called "bugle" in today's parlance. Ranks proceed from one (lieutenant) to five (fire chief) bugles.

Note: In place of bugles, ladder companies are signified by axes, rescue companies by life guns, squad companies by crossed ladders and stacked tip nozzles, and marine companies by bugles with an anchor.

Media
The firefighters, paramedics, and EMTs of STLFD are featured in A&E Network's reality series Live Rescue.

Fallen Firefighters 
From May 17, 1849, to Jan 13th, 2022, the Supporting Heroes Page reported that 171 Firefighters in the St. Louis Fire Department died in the line of duty.

Marine Division

As of 2013, there are four small fireboats operated in St. Louis.
The largest two are named.
The  Jack Buck was commissioned in 2003 and the  Stan Musial in 2013.

Notable incidents

Great Fire of 1849

On May 17, 1849, at 9:00 p.m., an enormous fire broke out in the heart of St. Louis. A steamboat named "The White Cloud" sitting on Cherry Street was on fire. The Fire Department, which, at that time, consisted of 9 hand engines and hose reels, responded to the scene. The moorings holding the boat broke, and the steamer floated downstream, setting 22 other steamers on fire as it went.

The flames leaped from building to building, sweeping everything on the levee for four blocks. The firemen were exhausted after fighting for over eight hours. The entire business portion of the city appeared lost. In a last-ditch effort to save the city, six buildings were spread with explosive powder and blown up. When the fire was finally contained after 11 hours, 430 buildings were destroyed, 23 steamboats along with over a dozen other boats were lost, and three people had died, including a fire captain.

Stations and apparatus and Fire Boats 
Below is a complete listing of all Fire Station and Apparatus Locations in the city of St. Louis by Battalion District, as of October 2019. In addition to the primary services (Fire Suppression, Emergency Medical Services, Fire Prevention, Fire Cause Determination, Hazardous Materials Mitigation, and Rescue Services) The St. Louis Fire Department also provides structural fire protection, emergency medical services, rescue response, and aircraft rescue firefighting at St. Louis Lambert International Airport from the two fire stations located there.

References

Organizations based in St. Louis
Government of St. Louis
Fire departments in Missouri
Fire departments of the United States
1857 establishments in Missouri